Quail Creek is a census-designated place (CDP) in Victoria County, Texas, United States. This was a new CDP for the 2010 census with a population of 1628.

Geography
Quail Creek is located at  (28.777323, -97.084815).

References

Census-designated places in Victoria County, Texas
Census-designated places in Texas